Ana Turk (née Nikšić; born 29 June 1989) is a Croatian handball player for RK Podravka Koprivnica and the Croatian national team.

She participated at the 2018 European Women's Handball Championship.

References

External links

1989 births
Living people
Sportspeople from Jakarta
Croatian female handball players
Expatriate handball players
Croatian expatriate sportspeople in Hungary
Fehérvár KC players
RK Podravka Koprivnica players
Mediterranean Games competitors for Croatia
Competitors at the 2009 Mediterranean Games